The 2019–20 season was Tranmere Rovers' 136th season of existence and their first back in EFL League One in five years following promotion from the 2018–19 EFL League Two. Along with competing in League One, the club participated in the FA Cup, EFL Cup and EFL Trophy.

The season covers the period from 1 July 2019 to 30 June 2020.

Transfers

Transfers in

Loans in

Loans out

Transfers out

Pre-season
The Whites announced pre-season friendlies against Liverpool, Stoke City, Carlisle United and Walsall.

Competitions

EFL League One

League table

Results summary

Results by matchday

Matches
On Thursday, 20 June 2019, the EFL League One fixtures were revealed.

FA Cup

The first round draw was made on 21 October 2019. The second round draw was made live on 11 November from Chichester City's stadium, Oaklands Park. The third round draw was made live on BBC Two from Etihad Stadium, Micah Richards and Tony Adams conducted the draw.

EFL Cup

The first round draw was conducted on 20 June.

EFL Trophy

On 9 July 2019, the pre-determined group stage draw was announced with Invited clubs to be drawn on 12 July 2019. The draw for the second round was made on 16 November 2019 live on Sky Sports. The third round draw was confirmed on 5 December 2019.

References

Tranmere Rovers
Tranmere Rovers F.C. seasons